The Pacific island nation Nauru first competed at the Summer Olympic Games in the 1996 games in Atlanta. It is the least populated nation in the 206-member International Olympic Committee. The nation is mainly known for its weightlifting tradition and all seven athletes that had competed for Nauru at the Olympics before 2012 were weightlifters.

Under the leadership of Vinson Detenamo, the Olympic movement began in Nauru in the early 1990s. The Olympic Committee was established in 1991 and talks with the International Olympic Committee started the same year. In May 1994 Nauru presented its bid to join the IOC and in September 1994 the nation was accepted, clearing the path for participation in the 1996 games.

1996 was not the first time that Nauru athletes participated in the Olympics.  After his win in the 1990 Commonwealth Games, weightlifter Marcus Stephen petitioned for citizenship of Samoa to compete in the 1992 games. Stephen competed for Nauru at the Olympics in 1996 and 2000, placing 11th in the 62 kg category in 2000. In 2009, he replaced Vinson Detenamo as president of Nauru's National Olympic Committee.

Paul Coffa is the weightlifting coach of the Oceania Weightlifting Federation and has been Nauru's Olympic coach since 1994.

Medal tables

Medals by Summer Games

Athletes
Weightlifting
Marcus Stephen – 1996, 2000 (First Olympian)
Quincy Detenamo – 1996
Gerard Garabwan – 1996
Sheeva Peo – 2000 (First Female Olympian)
Reanna Solomon – 2004
Itte Detenamo – 2004, 2008, 2012
Yukio Peter – 2004
Judo
Sled Dowabobo – 2012

See also
 List of flag bearers for Nauru at the Olympics

References

External links